York is a small rural village in Benson County, North Dakota, United States. The population was 17 at the 2020 census. There is a gasoline station there, and a granary, and farm equipment repair services.

York was founded in 1886 and named after York, England by Great Northern Railway President James J. Hill.  It was one of several sites along the Great Northern's transcontinental route between Devils Lake and Minot that were named after places in England (the others were Berwick, Leeds, Norwich, Penn, Rugby, Surrey, and Tunbridge).

Geography
York is located at  (48.312115, -99.574181).

Demographics

2010 census
As of the census of 2010, there were 23 people, 11 households, and 7 families living in the city. The racial makeup of the city was 87.0% White and 13.0% from two or more races.

There were 11 households, of which 18.2% had children under the age of 18 living with them, 45.5% were married couples living together, 18.2% had a male householder with no wife present, and 36.4% were non-families. 36.4% of all households were made up of individuals, and 18.2% had someone living alone who was 65 years of age or older. The average household size was 2.09 and the average family size was 2.71.

The median age in the city was 52.5 years. 17.4% of residents were under the age of 18; 0.0% were between the ages of 18 and 24; 26% were from 25 to 44; 17.3% were from 45 to 64; and 39.1% were 65 years of age or older. The gender makeup of the city was 47.8% male and 52.2% female.

2000 census
As of the census of 2000, there were 26 people, 11 households, and 7 families living in the city. The population density was 114.1 people per square mile (43.6/km). There were 32 housing units at an average density of 140.4 per square mile (53.7/km). The racial makeup of the city was 96.15% White, and 3.85% from two or more races.

There were 11 households, out of which 27.3% had children under the age of 18 living with them, 72.7% were married couples living together, and 27.3% were non-families. 27.3% of all households were made up of individuals, and 9.1% had someone living alone who was 65 years of age or older. The average household size was 2.36 and the average family size was 2.75.

In the city, the population was spread out, with 26.9% under the age of 18, 19.2% from 25 to 44, 30.8% from 45 to 64, and 23.1% who were 65 years of age or older. The median age was 48 years. For every 100 females, there were 100.0 males. For every 100 females age 18 and over, there were 111.1 males.

The median income for a household in the city was $47,917, and the median income for a family was $49,583. Males had a median income of $23,125 versus $0 for females. The per capita income for the city was $22,529. None of the population and none of the families were below the poverty line.

Education
York is in Leeds School District 6.

References in popular culture
York, North Dakota is mentioned humorously in an episode of the television show How I Met Your Mother. In the episode, Ted, the lead character, mentions that he has a new architecture project updating the "new York public library", making it sound like it is the New York Public Library, but instead is the "public library of York, North Dakota". Also mentioned in the show, the library has two sections, "fishing and non-fishing." (In reality, there is no library at York.

References

External links
 Our heritage : Leeds, York, 1886-1986 from the Digital Horizons website

Cities in Benson County, North Dakota
Cities in North Dakota
Populated places established in 1887
1887 establishments in Dakota Territory